The women's 500 metres in speed skating at the 1980 Winter Olympics took place on 15 February, at the James B. Sheffield Olympic Skating Rink.

Records
Prior to this competition, the existing world and Olympic records were as follows:

The following new Olympic record was set.

Results

References

Women's speed skating at the 1980 Winter Olympics
Olymp
Skat